Dankers is a surname. Notable people with the surname include:

 Arne Dankers (born 1980), Canadian speed skater
 Dick Dankers (1950–2018), Dutch furniture designer and gallery owner
 Oskars Dankers (1883–1965), Latvian general

See also
 Danker